Niedźwiedzice  is a village in the administrative district of Gmina Chojnów, within Legnica County, Lower Silesian Voivodeship, in south-western Poland. 

References

External links

Villages in Legnica County